The Deadliest Species is a Big Finish Productions audio drama based on the  British science fiction television series The Tomorrow People.

Synopsis 
Homo Superior - the next stage of human evolution. Young people with super powers, dedicated to safeguarding planet Earth. From their secret laboratory deep beneath the streets of London, aided by their super-computer TIM, they watch and wait for others like themselves - and guard against threats to all mankind. They are the Tomorrow People.

The Galactic Federation is at war with the rapacious Sorson Empire, and losing. Two Federation ambassadors, negotiating a peace treaty, have been kidnapped by the Sorsons. One, however, has escaped, and joined forces with the anti-Sorson rebellion on the planet Desh. From there, he heads back home, to Earth, and his friends John and TIM of the Tomorrow People, pursued by the vengeful Sorsons.

The ambassador in question is Stephen Jameson, one of the first Tomorrow People. But can the Deshian rebel he has befriended be trusted? Or are the secrets she carries more deadly than even Stephen realises?

Plot 
Part 1: Written on the Tablets of Eternity

Part 2: Unrighteous Deeds

Part 3: The Price to be Paid at Last

Cast
John - Nicholas Young
Elena - Helen Goldwyn
Paul - Daniel Wilson
TIM/Timus - Philip Gilbert
Stephen - Peter Vaughan-Clarke
Hollos - Lisa Bowerman
Sorsons - Roy Skelton

External links
The Deadliest Species product page at Big Finish archived by archive.org
The Deadliest Species

British radio dramas
2001 audio plays
The Tomorrow People